Bărăganu is a commune in Constanța County, Northern Dobruja, Romania. The commune includes two villages:
 Bărăganu (historical name: Osmanfacâ) - named after the Bărăgan Plain
 Lanurile (historical name: Ebechioi)

Demographics
At the 2011 census, Bărăganu had 1,850 Romanians (97.21%), 7 Roma  (0.37%), 4 Germans (0.21%), 4 Turks (0.21%), 19 Tatars (1.00%), 19 others (1.00%).

References

Communes in Constanța County
Localities in Northern Dobruja